In baseball statistics, defensive runs saved (DRS) measures the number of runs a player saved or cost his team on defense relative to an average player. Any positive number is above average, and the best fielders typically have a DRS figure of 15 to 20 for a season. The statistic was developed by Baseball Info Solutions and the data used in calculating it first became available for Major League Baseball (MLB) in 2003.

Definition
Fielding percentage is the statistic that has traditionally been used to measure defensive ability, but it fails to account for a fielder's defensive range. Fielders who can cover a large area on defense are able to make plays that most players would not have the chance to make. DRS was created to take range into account when measuring a player's defensive ability. 

In calculating DRS, points are either added or subtracted to a fielder's rating depending on whether or not they make a play on a ball that is hit towards them. For example, if a ball hit to the center fielder is expected to be caught 30 percent of the time, the fielder will lose .3 points if he does not catch it, or will gain .7 points if he does catch it. Each player's total points are later adjusted based on league averages, both with regards to average defensive performance, and with regards to how many runs a "point" equates to.

Example

The table below shows a comparison between the top 10 shortstops in terms of fielding percentage and the top 10 shortstops in terms of defensive runs saved from 2002 to 2019 in MLB. The table shows that only two players appear on both lists (Simmons and Hardy), exemplifying that there is a difference in what the two statistics measure.

Leaders
Note that DRS statistics are only available from the 2003 MLB season through the present. Thus, players of earlier eras who were noted for the defensive skills—such as third baseman Brooks Robinson and shortstop Ozzie Smith—were not evaluated in this manner. Also note that there is some variation in DRS as presented on baseball reference sites—for example, Baseball-Reference.com credits Adrián Beltré with a DRS figure of 201 for his career, while FanGraphs credits him with 200. The below figures are sourced from FanGraphs.

Single season
Through the end of the 2021 MLB season, the highest DRS recorded in a single season was by shortstop Andrelton Simmons, who had a DRS of 41 in 2017, while the lowest DRS recorded in a single season was by center fielder Matt Kemp, who had a DRS of -33 in 2010.

Career
Through the end of the 2021 MLB season, the highest cumulative DRS for a career is 200, by third baseman Adrián Beltré, while the lowest DRS for a career is -165 by shortstop Derek Jeter. Note that the totals for both Beltré and Jeter only reflect 2003 onward, even though both players began their MLB careers earlier.

See also
 Ultimate zone rating

References

Fielding statistics